Moquilea tomentosa (syn. Licania tomentosa) is a species of flowering plant in the family Chrysobalanaceae, native to most of Brazil. It is widely cultivated for its abundant fruit in South America and South Africa, and it is used as a street tree in Brazil and Colombia.

References

Chrysobalanaceae
Fruit trees
Endemic flora of Brazil
Flora of Northeast Brazil
Flora of South Brazil
Flora of Southeast Brazil
Plants described in 1840